Koromfé is a Gur language spoken in a U-shaped area around the town of Djibo, in the north of Burkina Faso and southeastern Mali, bordering Dogon Country.

Geographic Distribution
The Koromfé language is spoken in the provinces of Bam and Sanmatenga in the Centre-Nord Region, in the Provinces of Loroum and Yatenga (Titao Subdistrict) in the Nord Region and in the Soum Province of the Sahel Region (Djibo–Aribinda Subdistrict).

Dialects
Koromfé has two dialects: The western dialect (also known as Koromba or Kurumba) and the eastern dialect (Fulse or Folse). There are two major dialect areas, most conveniently termed East and West. The traditional centre of the Eastern area is Aribinda and of the Western area Pobé-Mengao. The western area is also known as Lorom (with two short close mid vowels), which should not be confused with the recently created province of Loroum centred on Titao. (Titao is ethnically Kurumba.) The grammar of Rennison (1997) describes the Western dialect.

Phonology

However, there is no phonemic palatal series of consonants in Koromfe.

The vowel system comprises 5 [-ATR] vowels  and their [+ATR] counterparts . All vowels occur both orally and (context-free) nasally, and long and short, giving 40 full vowels. There is also a schwa  which alternates with zero and disappears in faster, casual speech.

Koromfe is the only Gur language, and one of only five Niger-Congo languages, listed in the World Atlas of Language Structures that is not tonal.

Writing system
Koromfé has no written form. A 2007 dictionary uses a IPA based orthography with "y" replacing "j".

References

Gur languages